Transatlantic is a 1960 film directed by Ernest Morris and starring June Thorburn, Robert Ayres (actor), and Pete Murray. It was first released on 30 August 1960

References

External links

1960 films
1960 crime films
British crime films
1960s English-language films
Films directed by Ernest Morris
1960s British films